Novimus Nos (January 20, 1956) is an Apostolic Letter of Pope Pius XII to the Catholic Bishops of the Eastern Catholic Rites, whose dioceses are devastated  after years of persecution. The letter commemorates the 1000th anniversary of the conversion of Saint Olga, which was the beginning of Christianity in Russia.

When the letter was written the Vatican was not aware that several of the addressees had already been deported to Siberia; five Catholic bishops were killed. The Pope describes the life of Saint Olga, who led her people out of the barbarianism of her time. She faced and overcame endless problems.   Her nephew Saint Vladimir continued in her spirit, and, as described in the encyclical Orientales omnes Ecclesias,  he maintained unity and cordial relations with the Holy See.

Pope Pius XII congratulates the Russian people to this great historic figure Olga on her 1000th anniversary, quoting the ancient Roman philosopher Marcus Tullius Cicero: Our fatherland is more precious than we are. The Pope continues, but the heavenly fatherland is even more precious, since it lasts for all eternity.   Although the situation at the time was unpromising, the Pope encourages not to lose faith, courage or unity. The quiet voices of all those, who are mistreated and in chains, powerfully  testify Christ Crucified.  God permits ridicule, and at times waits with His reply to test and purify  His faithful. But because He is just, He will surely accept the prayers of those who are persecuted because of Him.   Pope Pius asks his bishops, to fully  trust in the Lord,  and to turn with instant prayers to the saints of the Russian people.  Persecutions  will thus  end  and the Russian people will  experience better times. In this hope, the pope concludes with his Apostolic Blessings.

References

Sources 
  Acta Apostolicae Sedis (AAS) Roma, Vaticano 1939-1952 
  Novimus Nos, Acta Apostolicae Sedis AAS 1952,  505
  Richard Cardinal Cushing, Pope Pius XII,  St. Paul Editions, Boston,  1959
  Alberto Giovannetti, Pio XII parla alla Chiesa del Silenzio, Editrice Ancona, Milano, 1959, German Translation, Der Papst spricht zur Kirche des Schweigens,Paulus Verlag, Recklinghausen, 1959

Persecution of Catholics during the pontificate of Pope Pius XII
Pope Pius XII apostolic writings
Catholic theology and doctrine

pl:Lista encyklik Papieża Piusa XII